Fabini is an Italian surname. Notable people with the surname include:

Eduardo Fabini (1882–1950), Uruguayan classical composer and musician
Jason Fabini (born 1974), American football player
Ricardo Fabini (born 1967), Uruguayan sailor

See also
3645 Fabini, a main-belt asteroid

Italian-language surnames